The Montgomery Bell Tunnel, also known as the Patterson Forge Tunnel, is a historic water diversion tunnel in Harpeth River State Park in Cheatham County, Tennessee. It was designated a Historic Civil Engineering Landmark in 1981, and a National Historic Landmark in 1994.

Description and history
The Montgomery Bell Tunnel is located in a unit of Harpeth River State Park, north of the town of Kingston Springs, Tennessee. In this area, the Harpeth River undergoes a series of meanders. In one of these, two parts of the river are quite close after a lengthy oxbow, known as the Narrows of the Harpeth. The tunnel runs roughly north-south across this isthmus. Neither the tunnel nor its portals are lined in any way. The tunnel has suffered some damage over the years due to erosive forces.

Montgomery Bell, an entrepreneur from Pennsylvania who was involved in iron foundries in central Tennessee, purchased the land in this area in 1818.  Recognizing the potential to apply water power to the process of producing wrought iron, he directed the construction of this tunnel, which facilitates use of a  drop in river height for power generation.

The tunnel is the first known example in the United States of a "full-scale" water diversion tunnel.  It is also apparently the first "full-scale" tunnel of any type in the United States, its completion predating that of the Auburn Tunnel (1821) in Pennsylvania, whose construction was begun first.  The tunnel is the only feature of Bell's iron works to survive; not surviving are a dam, head race, and the iron foundry itself, as well as Bell's house, which was built nearby.

During the 1930s, the land in this area was leased to the Boy Scouts of America for use as a summer camp.  It was deeded to the state in 1978.

In the late evening, on September 2, 2011, a fire was lit in the tunnel. The amount of driftwood from 2010's flood in the tunnel enlarged the fire. The fire was eventually extinguished in the early hours of the morning. The tunnel, and the road passing over it, were damaged. It and the road were stabilized, however, and Montgomery Bell Tunnel is again safe.

See also
List of National Historic Landmarks in Tennessee
National Register of Historic Places listings in Cheatham County, Tennessee

References

External links
About Harpeth River State Park - Tennessee State Parks web site

National Historic Landmarks in Tennessee
Buildings and structures in Cheatham County, Tennessee
Water tunnels in the United States
Historic Civil Engineering Landmarks
Tunnels in Tennessee
Water tunnels on the National Register of Historic Places
Tunnels completed in 1819
Transportation buildings and structures on the National Register of Historic Places in Tennessee
National Register of Historic Places in Cheatham County, Tennessee